Suhanur Rahman Sami is a Bangladeshi film director and screenwriter, who is best known as the first director of Bangladeshi superstar Shakib Khan. He started his film career as an assistant of director Shibli Sadik. His first film was Biswas Abiswas (1988). He is best known in Dhallywood for directing romantic films. He launched Salman Shah and Moushumi with the film Keyamat Theke Keyamat in 1993 and he also launched Shakib Khan, with the film Ananta Bhalobasha in 1999. Other notable films directed by him are Keyamot Theke Keyamot (1993), Amar Jaan Amar Pran (2008), Poran Jai Jolia Re (2010), Se Amar Mon Kereche (2012) etc. He is currently the principal of the Universal Performing Arts Institute.

Career

Sohan started his film career in 1977 as an assistant to director Shibli Sadik. He later worked as an assistant in Shahidul Haque Khan's Kalmilata (1981), A J Mintu's Ashanti (1986) and Shibli Sadik's Wet Eyes (1988). His first film as a solo and lead director was Biswas Abhiswas (1988). His first success in directing came from Keyamat Theke Keyamat (1993), which is a remake of Hindi film Qayamat Se Qayamat Tak (1989) starring by Aamir Khan and Juhi Chawla. In 1999 he directed ''Ananta Bhalobasha, which was become notable as the debut film of Shakib Khan and Erin Zaman, the younger sister of actress Moushumi. Although the film was not very successful, Khan as a hero caught the attention of everyone.

Selected filmography
 Biswas Abiswas (1988)
 Love (1991)
 Benam Badsha (1992)
 Keyamat Theke Keyamat (1993)
 Akheri Rasta (1994)
 Bidrohi Konna (1996)
 Shojon (1996)
 Amar Ghor Amar Behesht (1997)
 Amar Desh Amar Prem (1998)
 Maa Jokhon Bicharok (1998)
 Amar Protigga
 Ananta Bhalobasha (1999)
 Killer (2000)
 Sotter Bijoy (2003)
 Swami Chintai (2004)
 Bolo Na Bhalobashi (2005)
 Brishti Bheja Akash (2007)
 Kotha Dao Sathi Hobe(2007)
 Amar Jaan Amar Pran (2008)
 Poran Jai Joliya Re (2010)
 Koti Takar Prem (2011)
 The Speed (2012)
 Se Amar Mon Kereche (2012)
 Ek Mon Ek Pran (2012)
 Lobhe Paap, Paape Mrittu (2014)
 Bhalo Lagar Cheyeo Ektu Beshi
 Jedi (2022)

References

External links
 

Living people
People from Dhaka
Bangladeshi film directors
Year of birth missing (living people)